Mexico is considered as the Hollywood of Latin America because of the strength of its music and television industry as well as its history of Cinema. Foreign artists have started or continued their career in Mexico, especially in the telenovela industry.

In music, several artists have re-located or started their career in Mexico because it is the largest Spanish-speaking country in the world. Bands like La Quinta Estación started their career in Mexico because they think only a few Spanish artist become famous internationally and from Mexico they have been able to become known in Argentina, Chile and the United States.

Africa

Kenya 
 Arap Bethke, actor

Americas

Argentina 
 Amanda Miguel (singer)
 Raúl Astor (actor, show host)
 Cristian Bach (actress)
 Patricio Borghetti (actor)
 Grecia Colmenares (actress)
 Rosa María Bianchi (actress)
 Chela Castro (actress)
 Juan Carlos Colombo (actor)
 Lucy Gallardo (actress)
 Javier Gómez (actor)
 Margarita Gralia (actress)
 Mariana Karr (actress)
 Sergio Kleiner (actor)
 Libertad Lamarque (actress, singer)
 Saul Lisazo (actor)
 Marga López (actress)
 Marcela López Rey (actress)
 Maky (actress)
 Roxana Martínez ("La Tetanic") (actress, model)
 Cecilia Ponce (model, actress)
 Manuel Puig (writer, screenwriter)
 Martin Ricca (actor, singer)
 Sebastián Rulli (actor, model)
 Sabrina Sabrok (model)
 Juan Soler (actor)
 René Strickler (actor)
 Thelma Tixou (model/actress)
 Barbara Torres (actress/comedian)
 Diego Verdaguer (singer)

Brazil 
 Denisse de Kalaffe (singer/songwriter)
 Guy Ecker (actor)
 Marcus Ornellas (actor)

Canada 
 Fannie Kauffman (actress)

Chile 
Rafael Araneda (TV host)
Lucho Gatica (singer)
Jorge González (lead singer of Los Prisioneros)
Alejandro Jodorowsky (film director)
La Ley (rock band)
Kudai (pop band)
Olivia Collins (actress)

Colombia 
 David Galindo (actor)
 Juan Pablo Gamboa (actor)
 Danna García (actress)
 Harry Geithner (actor)
 Shakira (singer)
 Daniel Arenas (actor)

Costa Rica 
 Crox Alvarado (actor)
 Vica Andrade (actress, model)
 Maribel Guardia (actress/singer)
 Mary Esquivel (vedette/actress)
 Rafael Rojas (actor)
 Chavela Vargas (singer)

Cuba 
 Amalia Aguilar (actress)
 Aylín Mújica (actress)
 Carmen Montejo (actress)
 César Évora (actor)
 Fannie Kauffman (actress)
 Francisco Gattorno (actor)
 Jacqueline García (actress, show host)
 Julia Marichal (actress)
 Julio Camejo (actor)
 Karen Juantorena (actress)
 Liz Vega (actress)
 María Antonieta Pons (actress)
 Mario Cimarro (actor)
 Niurka Marcos (actress/singer)
 Óscar Ortiz de Pinedo (actor)
 Pedro Sicard (actor)
 Rafael Bertrand (actor)
 Raquel Olmedo (actress)
 Rene Lavan (actor)
 Rosa Carmina (actress)
 Ninón Sevilla (dancer/actress)
 William Levy (actor)
 Zully Montero (actress)

Dominican Republic 
 Anthony Alvarez (actor)
 Carlos Cámara (actor)
 Andrés García (actor)
 Carlos de la Mota (actor)

Guatemala 

 Álvaro Morales (sportscaster)
 Ricardo Arjona (singer)
 Deborah David (model)
 Héctor Sandarti (comedian)

Paraguay 
 Wanda Seux (vedette)

Peru 
 Patricia Pereyra (actress)
 Ricardo Blume (actor)
 Roberto Ballesteros (actor)
 Saby Kamalich (actress)
 Tania Libertad (singer)

Puerto Rico 
 Yerye Beirute, (actor)
 Armando Calvo, (actor)
 Braulio Castillo, (actor)
 Iris Chacón, (vedette/actress)
 Chayanne, (singer/actor)
 Mapita Cortés, (actress)
 Mapy Cortés, (actress)
 Alba Nydia Díaz, (actress)
 Adamari López, (actress)
 Johnny Lozada, (singer/actor)
 Ricky Martin, (singer/actor)
 Charlie Masso, singer/actor
 Luis Miguel, (singer/actor) 
 Carlos Ponce, (singer/actor)
 Osvaldo Ríos, (actor)

United States 
 Pepe Aguilar (singer)
 Alexis Ayala (actor)
 Angélica María (singer/actress)
 Elizabeth Campbell (actress))
 Erik Estrada (actor)
 Alex González (drummer of Maná)
 Ha*Ash (band)
 Marisela (singer)
 Yolanda Montes "Tongolele" (dancer/actress)
 Luis José Santander (actor)
 Julieta Venegas (singer)
 Manoella Torres (singer)
 Michelle Vieth (actress)

Uruguay 
 Marcelo Buquet (actor)
 Sergio Fachelli (singer and songwriter)
 Bárbara Mori (actress)

Venezuela 
 Rosita Arenas (actress)
 Grecia Colmenares (actress)
 Fernando Carrillo (actor)
 Gaby Espino (actress)
 Enrique Guzmán (singer/actor)
 Lupita Ferrer (actress)
 Miguel de León (actor)
 Alicia Machado (actress)
 Luis José Santander (actor)
 Gabriela Spanic (actress)
 Raúl Vale (singer/actor/comedian)

Europe

Albania 
 Xhevdet Bajraj (writer)

Austria 
 Barbara Angely (actress)
 Isabel del Puerto (actress)

Bulgaria 
 Dobrina Cristeva (actress)

Czech Republic 
 Miroslava (actress)

England 
 Azela Robinson (actress)
 Beatriz Sheridan
 Jacqueline Voltaire (actress)

France 
 Brigitte Aubé (actress)
 Angelique Boyer (actress)
 Elizabeth Katz (actress)
 Christiane Martel (actress)

Germany 
 Christa Linder (actress)
Sabine Moussier (actress)

Italy 
 Rosángela Balbó (actress)
 Ángel Di Stefani (stunt double/actor)
 Martha Roth (actress)
 Maura Monti (actress)
 Nicky Mondellini (actress)

Latvia 
 Wolf Rubinski (actor)

Lithuania 
 Estanislao Shilinsky Bachanska (actor)

Montenegro 
 Sasha Montenegro (vedette)

Netherlands 
 Roberto Vander (actor)

Norway 
 Eva Norvind (actress)

Poland 
 Arleta Jeziorska (actress)
 Maya Mishalska (actress)
 Dominika Paleta (actress)
 Ludwika Paleta (actress)
 Zbigniew Paleta (violin player/movie score)
 Kristoff (actor/TV personality)

Romania 
 Joana Benedek (actress)

Russia 
 Irina Baeva (actress)
 Julián de Meriche (actor)

Spain 
 Luis Buñuel (film director)
 Isabelita Blanch (actress)
 Plácido Domingo (singer)
 Angelines Fernández "La bruja del 71" (actress)
 Prudencia Grifell (actress)
 Ofelia Guilmáin (actress)
 Emilia Guiú (actress)
 Belinda (singer/actress)
 Frances Ondiviela (actress)
 Juan Orol (filmmaker/actor)
 Mercedes Molto (actress)
 Sara Montiel (actress and singer)
 Monica Naranjo (singer)
 Mercedes Pascual (actress)
 La Quinta Estación (rock band)
 Francisco Rabal (actor)
 Enrique Rambal (actor)
 Ivan Sanchez (actor)
 Anna Silvetti (actress)
 Yolanda Ventura (singer/actress)
 Rocío Dúrcal (singer)
 Shaila Dúrcal (singer)

Ukraine 
 Ana Layevska (actress)

Asia

Iran 
 Irán Eory (actress)

See also
Demographics of Mexico
Immigration in Mexico

External links
 (La Quinta Estación) rinde homenaje a México con DVD  ("La Quinta Estación presents homage to Mexico with a DVD") article on El Universal

Mexico
Entertainers